Tauseeq Ahmed (born 17 October 1997) is a Pakistani cricketer. He made his List A debut for Karachi Whites in the 2018–19 Quaid-e-Azam One Day Cup on 22 September 2018. He made his first-class debut for Karachi Whites in the 2018–19 Quaid-e-Azam Trophy on 19 October 2018.

References

External links
 

1997 births
Living people
Pakistani cricketers
Karachi Whites cricketers